Events from the year 1380 in Ireland.

Incumbent
Lord: Richard II

Deaths
 Donell Ó Dubhda, King of Ui Fiachrach Muaidhe.
 Milo Sweetman, Archbishop of Armagh.

References